Maloul al-Hussein is a Syrian politician from the Unified Communist Party who served as Minister of State for People's Assembly Affairs in the First Hussein Arnous government.

References 

Living people

Year of birth missing (living people)
21st-century Syrian politicians
Syrian communists
Government ministers of Syria